Cyrus Rexford House is a historic home located at Rexford, Saratoga County, New York. It consists of a three-story, Stick style main block built in 1883, with a -story rear block built about 1850.  It also has a one-story rear ell.  The main block has a steeply pitched hipped roof with bracketed overhang.  The house features an elaborate mix of decorative detailing and polychrome paint scheme.  Also on the property are the contributing carriage house and gambrel roofed barn.

It was listed on the National Register of Historic Places in 2011.

References

Houses on the National Register of Historic Places in New York (state)
Stick-Eastlake architecture in the United States
Houses completed in 1883
Houses in Saratoga County, New York
National Register of Historic Places in Saratoga County, New York